is a former Japanese swimmer who competed in the 1988 Summer Olympics.

References

1969 births
Living people
Japanese male medley swimmers
Japanese male freestyle swimmers
Olympic swimmers of Japan
Swimmers at the 1988 Summer Olympics
20th-century Japanese people